Senator Quincy may refer to:

Josiah Quincy (New Hampshire politician) (1793–1875), New Hampshire State Senate
Josiah Quincy III (1772–1864), Massachusetts State Senate
Josiah Quincy Jr. (1802–1882), Massachusetts State Senate